Biqulzar also spelled as Baqulzar or Bequl zar was a historical region located in eastern Ethiopia.  The state was positioned east of the Awash River. Historian Hussein Ahmed, proposes it was a general term for districts east of Amhara region in the fourteenth century.

Etymology 
Biqulzar originates from the Harari language meaning “verdure along a stream.”

History
According to fourteenth century Arab historian Ibn Fadlallah al-Umari, Biqulzar was one of Ifat's ancient metropolises or regions. 

In the fourteenth century, Ethiopian emperor Amda Seyon fought the Wargar or Warjih people in Biqulzar. According to Salvatore Tsdeschi, in 1332 Amda Seyon had summoned his vassal ruler of Ifat, Jamal ad-Din I in Biqulzar however Manfred Kropp believes Amda Seyon met with a distinct ruler of Biqulzar.

References

Medieval Ethiopia
History of Ethiopia